Alix Sophie Wilton Regan (born 26 January 1986) is an English actress known for her roles as Samantha Traynor in Mass Effect 3 and Aya in Assassin's Creed Origins.

Early life
Born in London, Wilton Regan attended L'Ile Aux Enfants primary school, the Lycee Francais Charles de Gaulle, and Latymer Upper School for A-Levels. She also attended Sylvia Young Theatre School and Stage Coach for acting, singing and dancing lessons outside of school.

After graduating, Wilton Regan enrolled in drama school and became the youngest ever student to be admitted to the NCDT and CDS accredited Drama Studio London. Whilst training, Wilton Regan represented her school at National level, in the BBC Radio Carlton Hobbs Awards. Wilton Regan was honoured by the BBC panel with two Special Commendation Awards: Best Shakespearean Monologue and Best Contemporary Duologue.

Career

Theatre
After graduating at the age of 20, her first stage appearance was as Hannah in the two-handed Retreat by playwright James Saunders, which won a FringeReview Award for Most Outstanding Theatre Show at The Edinburgh Festival Fringe 2007 and transferred to the New End Theatre, London. Since then, Wilton Regan has performed in theatrical productions at Theatre Royal Haymarket, The Tricycle Theatre, The King's Head Theatre, The Arcola Theatre and The Landor Theatre. She also performed opposite Jonathan Pryce in "King Lear" at The Almeida Theatre in Michael Attenborough's last show as artistic director there.

Film
Wilton Regan appears in the lead role of Mary Shelley in the directorial debut of Nora Unkel, "A Nightmare Wakes", which wrapped production in summer 2019. Alix co-starred in the feature film The Wife, as Susannah Castleman, the daughter of Glenn Close and Jonathan Pryce's characters, and the sister of Max Irons'. The film is written by Jane Anderson and directed by Bjorne Runge. Wilton Regan also appeared in feature film "The Isle" alongside Conleth Hill and Alex Hassell, directed by Matthew Butler-Hart. She directed her first short film, "She Lies Sleeping", in April 2019 for the London Sci-Fi Film Festival 48Hr Challenge. She is also a Founding Director of the London On Film Festival, held at the UK's first social enterprise cinema, The Lexi Cinema, in north-west London. She appears as 'Zoe' in the 2012 UK feature film Life Just Is.

Filmography

Film

Television

Video games

References

External links
 
 
 https://waringandmckenna.com/clients/alix-wilton-regan/

Living people
21st-century English actresses
English television actresses
English film actresses
English voice actresses
English female models
People educated at Lycée Français Charles de Gaulle
Alumni of the Drama Studio London
1986 births
People from Westminster